Frankeneck is an Ortsgemeinde – a municipality belonging to a Verbandsgemeinde, a kind of collective municipality – in the Bad Dürkheim district in Rhineland-Palatinate, Germany.

Geography

Location 
The municipality lies in the Palatinate Forest at the forks of the Speyerbach and the Hochspeyerbach. It belongs to the Verbandsgemeinde of Lambrecht, whose seat is in the like-named town.

History 
The municipality was founded in 1785.

Religion 
In 2007, 44.9% of the inhabitants were Evangelical and 29.2% Catholic. The rest belonged to other faiths or adhered to none.

Politics

Municipal council 
The council is made up of 12 council members, who were elected at the municipal election held on 7 June 2009, and the honorary mayor as chairman.

The municipal election held on 7 June 2009 yielded the following results:

Coat of arms 
The German blazon reads: Durch eine blaue Wellendeichsel, oben rechts in Rot ein schwebendes blaues Beil mit goldenem Stiel, oben links in Rot ein schwebender blauer Forstsichelhaken mit goldenem Stiel, unten in Silber eine blaubereifte rote Bütte mit silbernem Inhalt, davor stehend ein rotes Rührsieb.

The municipality’s arms might in English heraldic language be described thus: A pall reversed wavy azure, dexter gules an axe palewise of the first helved Or, the head to chief and the edge to sinister, sinister gules a forester’s bill palewise of the first helved of the third, the head to chief and the hook to dexter, in base argent issuant from base a vat of the second hooped of the first with contents of the field, surmounted by a stirring sieve palewise of the second issuant from base, the handle to base.

The arms were approved in 1951 by the Mainz Ministry of the Interior, and they go back to a court seal from 1733. The charges recall that the municipality was founded as a logging village.

Town partnerships 
Frankeneck fosters partnerships with the following places:
 Tenbury Wells, Worcestershire, England, United Kingdom
 “Les Thuits” (Le Thuit-Signol, Le Thuit-Anger and Le Thuit-Simer), Eure, France

Culture and sightseeing

Museums 
In Frankeneck, the heritage railway, the Kuckucksbähnel, has a stop. The railway runs on a line between Neustadt an der Weinstraße and Elmstein. There is also a papermaking and local history museum with exhibits about local history and the development of the local paper industry.

Sport and leisure 
TV Frankeneck (sport club) offers football and gymnastics.

Furthermore, there are a singing club and many other clubs.

Famous people

Sons and daughters of the town 
 Walter Faller, SPD politician

References

External links 

Palatinate Forest
Bad Dürkheim (district)